Axel Dalberg Poulsen (7 April 1961, Holbaek, Denmark) is a Danish naturalist, botanist, and curator. His research interests are the flora of Denmark and its surroundings, taxonomy and biology of the Orchidaceae, and conservation biology.

In 1993, he obtained a doctorate degree in tropical biology from Aarhus University; defending the thesis "Investigations of herbs in two humid tropical lowlands forests". His supervisor was Dr. Iván Nielsen.

He focuses on the ginger family Zingiberaceae. He is a leading expert on the genus Etlingera. 

He is associate professor of the University of Copenhagen Botanical Garden, part of the Natural History Museum of Denmark.

In 2016, as part of the Flora of Nepal Project, at the Royal Botanic Gardens in Edinburgh, he was sponsored to participate in an expedition to collect specimens in eastern Nepal and train the staff of the National Herbarium of Nepal to collect and preserve material from Zingiberales. Support from the Fund Expedition Peter Davis of the University of Edinburgh to carry out fieldwork in Papua New Guinea as part of the ongoing project "Gingers of Papua New Guinea".

References

External links

 Welcome - Axel Dalberg Poulsen

20th-century Danish botanists
1961 births
Living people
Aarhus University alumni
21st-century Danish botanists